La Cruz Formation may refer to:
 La Cruz Formation, Argentina, an Aptian geologic formation in Argentina
 La Cruz Formation, Costa Rica, a Miocene geologic formation in Costa Rica
 La Cruz Formation, Cuba, a Late Pliocene geologic formation in Cuba